Stanley Korshak is an American luxury goods specialty department store in Dallas, Texas. The largest independent department store in the United States, it is located in the Uptown neighborhood in The Crescent retail complex.

History
In 1909 Stanley Korshak opened a luxury goods store in Chicago, one of the first to offer designer women's apparel. After suffering financial problems throughout the 1980s, Dallas heiress and developer Caroline Hunt purchased the rights to the name. A new store in Dallas in the upscale Crescent development opened in 1986; the  store in Chicago closed in 1990. The Dallas store was managed by Crawford Brock, who later purchased the business in 2002. Over the years the store has expanded to include additional departments and offerings covering 75,000 square feet. It has garnered several awards and accolades, including being named one of the 50 most influential men's stores in America by Women's Wear Daily in 2013. Industry estimates put annual sales at $40 million, or $600 per square foot.

References

External links
Stanley Korshak

Clothing retailers of the United States
Companies based in Dallas
Department stores of the United States